Statistics of Empress's Cup in the 2004 season.

Overview
It was contested by 24 teams, and Nippon TV Beleza won the championship.

Results

1st round
Hokkaido Bunkyo University Meisei High School 5-1 Toyama Ladies SC
Okayama Yunogo Belle 3-1 Tokyo Women's College of Physical Education
Renaissance Kumamoto FC 1-0 Bucchigiri FC
JEF United Ichihara 0-3 Hoo High School
Nagoya FC 4-6 Shimizudaihachi SC
AS Elfen Sayama FC 1-6 Kanagawa University
Albirex Niigata 9-0 Hiroshima Fujita SC
INAC Leonessa 3-2 Tokiwagi Gakuken High School

2nd round
Saitama Reinas FC 6-0 Hokkaido Bunkyo University Meisei High School
Okayama Yunogo Belle 3-1 Ohara Gakuen JaSRA
YKK AP Tohoku LSC Flappers 5-0 Renaissance Kumamoto FC
Hoo High School 0-5 Iga FC Kunoichi
Tasaki Perule FC 13-0 Shimizudaihachi SC
Kanagawa University 0-1 Takarazuka Bunnys
Speranza FC Takatsuki 1-2 Albirex Niigata
INAC Leonessa 1-3 Nippon TV Beleza

Quarterfinals
Saitama Reinas FC 6-1 Okayama Yunogo Belle
YKK AP Tohoku LSC Flappers 0-0 (pen 3-4) Iga FC Kunoichi
Tasaki Perule FC 5-0 Takarazuka Bunnys
Albirex Niigata 0-5 Nippon TV Beleza

Semifinals
Saitama Reinas FC 1-1 (pen 4-3) Iga FC Kunoichi
Tasaki Perule FC 1-3 Nippon TV Beleza

Final
Saitama Reinas FC 1-3 Nippon TV Beleza
Nippon TV Beleza won the championship.

References

Empress's Cup
2004 in Japanese women's football